"Pressure Drop" is a song recorded in 1969 by the Maytals for record producer Leslie Kong. The song appears on their 1970 album Monkey Man (released in Jamaica by Beverley's Records) and From the Roots (released in the UK by Trojan Records). "Pressure Drop" helped launch the band's career outside Jamaica when the song was featured on the soundtrack to the 1972 film The Harder They Come, which introduced reggae to much of the world. In 2004, Rolling Stone rated the song No. 453 in its list of the 500 Greatest Songs of All Time.
This song has been covered often, most notably by Robert Palmer, the Specials, Keith Richards, Izzy Stradlin and the Ju Ju Hounds, the Oppressed and the Clash.

In an interview in 2016, songwriter Frederick "Toots" Hibbert said that "Pressure Drop" was a song about karmic justice.

Charts

References 

1969 songs
1969 singles
1979 singles
Toots and the Maytals songs
Songs about revenge
Songs written by Toots Hibbert
Song recordings produced by Leslie Kong
The Clash songs
The Specials songs